Barcalo may refer to:

 Edward J. Barcalo (1870-1963) U.S. inventor, entrepreneur, businessman, founder of Barcalo
 Barcalounger Company, formerly Barcalo